The Hyundai Aero (hangul:현대 에어로) was a full-sized single-decker coach built by the Hyundai Motor Company. It was primarily used as an intercity bus.

It is distinguishable by a front 'Aero' badge by Aero Space, Aero Express, and Aero Queen, but the common Hyundai badge is usually used on the rear.

In Japan, Asia-Pacific, Mid-East, Africa, South America, its principal competitors are Kia Granbird, Daewoo BH.

Models

The Aero was designed by Hyundai Motor Company and Mitsubishi Fuso. It was a rebadged Mitsubishi Fuso Aero Bus. The three variants are:
Aero Space: both available for diesel and CNG.
Aero Space LD: A short wheelbase, standard deck bus.
Aero Space LS: A short wheelbase, standard deck bus with air suspension.
Aero Hi-Space: A long wheelbase, standard deck bus with air suspension.
Aero Express: A long wheelbase bus with air suspension.
Aero Express LDX: standard deck bus with air suspension.
Aero Express HSX: high deck bus with air suspension.
Aero Express Hi-Class: high deck bus with air suspension.
Aero Queen: A luxurious long wheelbase, high deck bus with air suspension.
Aero Queen
Aero Queen Hi-Class

See also

Hyundai Motor Company
Hyundai Aero City
Hyundai RB
 List of buses

Rear-wheel-drive vehicles
Buses of South Korea
Intercity buses
Single-deck buses
Hyundai buses
Vehicles introduced in 1985